Into Mischief (foaled March 28, 2005) is a retired American Thoroughbred racehorse and active sire. During his racing career, he won three of six starts including the CashCall Futurity. Since his retirement, he has developed into an outstanding sire, leading the North American sire list in 2019, 2020, 2021 and 2022. His offspring include Authentic (2020 American Horse of the Year), Mandaloun (2021 Kentucky Derby), Life Is Good (Breeders' Cup Dirt Mile) and Covfefe (female sprint Champion).

Background
Into Mischief was bred in Kentucky by James T. Hines Jr. He was from the first crop of Harlan's Holiday, a Grade I-winning grandson of Storm Cat. Into Mischief was one of the first foals out of Leslie's Lady, a stakes-winning daughter of Tricky Creek. Leslie's Lady later produced multiple Eclipse Award winner Beholder and Grade I winner Mendelssohn, and was named the 2016 Kentucky Broodmare of the Year. She comes from a distinguished female family that also produced dual Classic winner I'll Have Another.

Into Mischief was sold as a yearling at the Fasig-Tipton Fall Sale for $80,000 to Gage Hill Stable. He was re-sold as a two-year-old in training at the Ocala Breeders' Sale for $180,000 to B. Wayne Hughes, the owner of Spendthrift Farm. He was trained by Richard Mandella.

Racing career

2007: two-year-old season
Into Mischief made his first start on October 21, 2007 in a -furlong maiden race at the Oak Tree meeting at Santa Anita. He dueled for the early lead with Bazzoom, running a fast opening quarter mile of 21.87 seconds. Bazoom dropped back on the turn, eventually finishing eleventh. Into Mischief continued to open up his lead under mild urging and won by  lengths. He finished second in his next start, the Hollywood Prevue Stakes at Hollywood Park on November 22. He got involved in a three-way duel for the lead on the outside of Massive Drama and Sky Cape, who tired after a half mile and finished tenth. Into Mischief got to within a head of Massive Drama in midstretch, but the latter rallied to win by  lengths.

Into Mischief finished his two-year-old campaign by winning the CashCall Futurity at Hollywood Park on December 22. In his first "two-turn" race at a distance of  miles, his main rivals were Colonel John, favored at 2-1, and Massive Drama at 3-1. Into Mischief was a relative longshot at 14-1. He raced just off the early pace set by Eaton's Gift, who tired on the far turn and finished seventh. Mandella said that the colt "put it all together today", and Hughes had thoughts of winning his first Kentucky Derby. "Maybe this horse will be the one."

2008: three-year-old season
Into Mischief started his three-year-old campaign in the San Vicente Stakes at Santa Anita on February 10, 2008, dropping back in distance to seven furlongs. His training for the race had been interrupted when Santa Anita was shut down several times because a newly installed synthetic dirt surface failed to drain properly after heavy rains. Despite this, he went off as the 7-5 favorite in a four horse field that also included Massive Drama and Georgie Boy, winner of the Del Mar Futurity.  Into Mischief and Massive Drama vied for the early lead, running the first half mile in :45.27. Into Mischief started to edge away in the stretch but shied when jockey Victor Espinoza went to the whip, briefly shifting leads. He was caught by Georgie Boy, who drew off to win by  lengths. "I was lucky to get him to the races," said Mandella, referring to the interrupted training, "but we got through that and at least we're still in the game."

Despite the loss, Into Mischief was still a highly ranked contender for the 2008 Kentucky Derby. Sportswriter Steve Haskin noted the colt's athleticism and said, "the race served as a good comeback performance that should set him up well for a return to two-turn races." However, Into Mischief developed an abscess in his left hind hoof and missed several weeks of training, taking him off the Triple Crown trail.

He returned to racing on October 25 in the 7-furlong Damascus Stakes, part of the undercard for the 2008 Breeders' Cup held at Santa Anita. The favorite was Georgie Boy at 7-5 with Into Mischief the second choice at 3-1. Into Mischief broke slowly and settled in fifth place along the rail. Rounding the turn he shifted to the outside and began to make up ground. Under a hand ride, he drew off to win by two lengths over Dancing in Silks (who would win the Breeders' Cup Sprint in 2009) with Georgie Boy well back in fourth.

Into Mischief made his final start in the seven furlong Malibu Stakes on December 26 at Santa Anita. He was the favorite in a seven-horse field that also included Colonel John (Santa Anita Derby, Travers Stakes), Bob Black Jack (Sunshine Millions Dash), Nownownow (Breeders' Cup Juvenile Turf) and Georgie Boy. Bob Black Jack, who had set a world record for six furlongs earlier in the year, went to the early lead and was never headed, winning by  lengths. Into Mischief sat back in fifth place during the first half mile, then maneuvered for position and closed late to finish second.

Into Mischief finished his career with three wins and three seconds from six starts, and earnings of $597,080.

Racing statistics

An asterisk after the odds means Into Mischief was the post-time favorite.

Retirement
Into Mischief was retired to stud at Spendthrift Farm for a fee of $12,500 for the 2009 season. In order to build support, Hughes offered a lifetime breeding right to breeders who completed "stands and nurses" contracts in each of his first two years at stud. Interest in him was moderate, and his stud fee dropped to $7,500 by 2012.

Into Mischief's first crop reached racing age in 2012. His first winner was Avalon Rose, who won a five-furlong maiden race on July 5. His first stakes winner was Goldencents, who won the Delta Downs Jackpot Stakes. From a small crop that contained just 21 starters, Into Mischief finished third on the North American first-crop sire list. Two members of his first crop, Goldencents and Vyjack, were starters in the 2013 Kentucky Derby. Commenting on Into Mischief's unexpected success at stud, Hughes said "We don't really know what we have. We might have Mr. Prospector; it's not knowing."

With the on-track success of that first crop, Into Mischief began to attract more recognition. The crop he sired in 2013 reached racing age in 2016 and started to move Into Mischief steadily up the North American stallion ranks. In 2018, Audible became his first offspring to be in the money in a Triple Crown race, finishing third in the Kentucky Derby. In 2019, Into Mischief was the leading sire in North America, with Eclipse Award-winning filly Covfefe being his leading performer. His offspring are generally known as sprinters, although his more recent crops contain horses who are able to contend at longer distances. Authentic became his first Classic winner in the 2020 Kentucky Derby. Into Mischief was again the leading sire in North America in 2020 with record progeny earnings of over $22 million.

In 2021, his offspring Mandaloun finished second in the 2021 Kentucky Derby and was later declared the winner after Medina Spirit was disqualified in February 2022 due to a positive drug test. Into Mischief led the North American sire list for the third straight year, breaking his own progeny earnings record in the process. His stud fee for 2022 was set at $250,000. He earned his fourth straight earnings title in 2022, again breaking his earnings record.

Stallion statistics

Notable progeny
His major stakes winners include:

c = colt, f = filly, g = gelding''

Pedigree

References

Racehorses bred in Kentucky
2005 racehorse births
Racehorses trained in the United States
United States Champion Thoroughbred Sires
Thoroughbred family 23-b